William Lai Ching-te (born 6 October 1959) is a Taiwanese politician who has been the Vice President of the Republic of China (Taiwan) since 2020. He served as a legislator in the Legislative Yuan from 1999 to 2010, and as Mayor of Tainan from 2010 to 2017, prior to taking office as premier of the Republic of China.

On 24 November 2018, he announced his intention to resign from the premiership after the Democratic Progressive Party suffered a major defeat in local elections, and left office on 14 January 2019 after the swearing-in of his successor Su Tseng-chang. Lai mounted a challenge against Tsai in the 2019 Democratic Progressive Party presidential primary and after defeat, served as the running mate of President Tsai Ing-wen in the 2020 Taiwan presidential election in which the tandem was victorious.

Early life and career
Born in Wanli, a rural coastal town in northern Taipei County (now New Taipei City) on 6 October 1959, Lai underwent schooling in Taipei City and studied at both National Cheng Kung University in Tainan and National Taiwan University in Taipei, where he specialized in rehabilitation.  Lai then studied at the Harvard School of Public Health for a Master's degree in Public Health, followed by an internship at National Cheng Kung University Hospital. He became an expert on spinal cord damage and served as a national consultant for such injuries.

Legislative career
After serving as part of the support team for Chen Ding-nan's unsuccessful electoral bid for Governor of Taiwan Province in 1994, Lai decided to enter politics himself. The next opportunity for election to a national body was the 1996 National Assembly, with Lai winning a seat representing Tainan City. Lai then joined the New Tide faction and stood as a candidate in the 1998 Legislative Yuan election, representing the Democratic Progressive Party in the second ward of Tainan City. He was successful in this election, and subsequently was reelected three times in 2001, 2004, and 2008. In total he served 11 years as a legislator, and was selected as Taiwan's "Best Legislator" four times in a row by Taipei-based NGO Citizen Congress Watch.

Mayor of Tainan (2010–2017)

With the 2010 reorganization of the municipalities in Taiwan, Tainan City and Tainan County were amalgamated into a single municipality, called Tainan. After successfully being selected in the Democratic Progressive Party (DPP) primaries in January 2010, Lai stood as the DPP candidate for the mayoral election on 27 November 2010, gaining 60.41% to defeat Kuomintang candidate Kuo Tien-tsai. He took office on 25 December 2010.

As a result of his strong showing in the mayoral election coupled with his relative youth and his control of the DPP heartland city of Tainan, Lai was considered to be a potential candidate for a presidential run in 2016. In 2013 an opinion poll ranked Lai as the most popular of the 22 city and county heads in Taiwan, with an approval rating of 87%.

Lai made on 5 June 2014 a visit to the city of Shanghai to assist an exhibition of art by the late Taiwanese painter Tan Ting-pho and met politicians of the Chinese Communist Party.

Lai stood for reelection on 29 November 2014 against Huang Hsiu-shuang of the Kuomintang. His opponent was considered to have such an uphill task in the DPP stronghold that she rode a black horse through the streets of Tainan as an election stunt; a hopeful allusion to her status as a "dark horse". Lai, on the other hand, did not plan many campaign activities, choosing to focus on mayoral duties. He eventually won the election by 45 percentage points, the largest margin of victory in any of the municipal races in the election.

Lai stepped down as Mayor in September 2017, after being appointed to the Premiership. He was succeeded in acting capacity by Lee Meng-yen.

Premier (2017–2019)

In September 2017, Premier Lin Chuan tendered his resignation to President Tsai Ing-wen, which was reluctantly accepted. A recent poll showed Lin's approve rating to be a mere 28.7%, with 6 in 10 respondents dissatisfied with the performance of his cabinet. On 5 September, President Tsai announced at a press conference that Lai would become the country's next head of the Executive Yuan.

Lai took office on 8 September as the 49th Premier of the Republic of China. Following Lai's appointment as premier, Tsai's approval ratings reached 46%, rebounding by more than 16 points since August. Lai made his first appearance as premier at the Legislative Yuan on 26 September, where he stated "I am a political worker who advocates Taiwan independence" but that "We are already an independent sovereign nation called the Republic of China. We don't need a separate declaration of independence". Lai has appeared to have moderated his position on Taiwanese independence particularly when he proposed the idea of "being close to China while loving Taiwan" in June 2017. He also expressed no desire to run against Tsai Ing-wen in the 2020 presidential election. On 28 September, the New Party called on the KMT to join it in filing a formal complaint against the Premier for sedition.

In October 2017, it was reported that Lai had garnered the approval of 68.8 percent of respondents in a survey, while 23 percent expressed dissatisfaction. However, critics say that his popularity may not last, due to his rapid reversal of his position on the issue of Taiwanese independence. However, on 20 October, Lai in response to General Secretary Xi Jinping's comments on the one China policy and the 1992 consensus at the 19th National Congress of the Chinese Communist Party, Lai said that the Taiwanese government, following the directives of Tsai Ing-wen, would fulfill its promise of not changing the status quo between the two neighbors and not ceding before pressure from Beijing, which comes in the form of military intimidation and an international blockade.

In November 2018, Lai tendered his resignation to the president, after the ruling DPP was trounced in local elections. Lai agreed to remain in office to help stabilize the government until the general budget was cleared by the Legislative Yuan in January 2019. Lai's cabinet resigned on 11 January 2019 and Su Tseng-chang was appointed as new premier.

Presidential campaign

On 18 March 2019, Lai Ching-te registered to run in the Democratic Progressive Party presidential primary, saying that he could shoulder the responsibility of leading Taiwan in defending itself from being annexed by China. This is the first time in Taiwanese history where a serious primary challenge has been mounted against a sitting president. The results of the DPP's primary poll released on 13 June shown that Tsai defeated Lai by winning 35.67 percent of the vote over Lai's 27.48 percent, officially becoming the DPP's presidential candidate for the 2020 election.

In November 2019, Lai accepted president Tsai Ing-wen's offer to become her running mate for the 2020 presidential election. Tsai secured over 57% of the ballot, winning a record 8.17 million votes in the election and began her second term in 2020.

Vice presidency (2020–2024)

During his vice presidency, Lai served as president Tsai Ing-wen's special envoy to Honduras for president Xiomara Castro's inauguration in January 2022. After the assassination of former Japanese prime minister Shinzo Abe, he made a private trip to Tokyo to pay his respects and became Taiwan's most senior official to visit Japan in five decades. In November 2022, Lai led representatives of Taiwan's travel agencies and industry associations to Palau to foster collaborations between the two countries.

In November 2022, president Tsai Ing-wen resigned as leader of DPP after the party's heavy losses in local elections. Lai officially registered as a candidate for the DPP chair election in December. Since Lai was the only candidate running, he became the new chairman of the DPP in 2023. In March 2023, Lai registered as the only person to run in the DPP's 2024 presidential primary and he is expected to be officially nominated by the ruling party in April.

References

External links 

 

1959 births
Living people
Democratic Progressive Party Members of the Legislative Yuan
Harvard School of Public Health alumni
Members of the 4th Legislative Yuan
Members of the 5th Legislative Yuan
Members of the 6th Legislative Yuan
Members of the 7th Legislative Yuan
Mayors of Tainan
National Cheng Kung University alumni
National Taiwan University alumni
Politicians of the Republic of China on Taiwan from New Taipei
Premiers of the Republic of China on Taiwan
Vice presidents of the Republic of China on Taiwan
Democratic Progressive Party chairpersons
Tainan Members of the Legislative Yuan
Taiwanese people of Hoklo descent
Taiwanese surgeons